Bad Girls may refer to:

Film and television 
 Bad Girls (1994 film), film by Jonathan Kaplan
 Bad Girls (2007 film), Mexican film
 Bad Girls (2012 film), Taiwanese romantic-comedy
 Bad Girls (TV series), British television series
 Bad Girls: The Musical, 2007 British West End musical based on the TV series
 "Bad Girls" (Buffy the Vampire Slayer), 1999 episode of the TV show Buffy the Vampire Slayer
 Bad Girls, 1981 pornographic film in the XRCO Hall of Fame

Music

Albums
 Bad Girls (Donna Summer album), 1979
 Bad Girls Tour, a 1979 concert tour by Donna Summer in support of the album
 Bad Girls (Mónica Naranjo album), 2002
 Bad Girls, a 2015 EP by MKTO

Songs
 "Bad Girls" (Donna Summer song), 1979
 "Bad Girls" (M.I.A. song), 2010
 "Bad Girls" (MKTO song), 2015
 "Bad Girls", a 2010 song by DJ Kay Slay from the album, More Than Just a DJ
 "Bad Girls", a 1983 song by Don Felder from the album, Airborne
 "Bad Girls", a 2001 song by Westlife from the album, World of Our Own
 "Bad Girls", a 2006 song by Vanilla Ninja from the album, Love Is War
 "Bad Girls", a 2010 song by Doda from the album, 7 pokus głównych
 "Bad Girls", a 2012 song by Solange from the EP, True
 "Bad Girls", a 2013 song by Lee Hyori from the album, Monochrome

Literature 
 Bad Girls (Wilson novel), 1996 children's novel by Jacqueline Wilson
 Bad Girls (Voigt novel), 1997 young-adult novel by Cynthia Voigt
 Bad Girls, 2005 novel by Alex McAulay
 Bad Girls, 2003 DC Comics series with covers by Darwyn Cooke
 B.A.D. Girls, Inc., a superhuman group in Marvel Comics

Other uses 
 Bad Girls (art exhibition), a 1994 exhibition curated by Marcia Tucker

See also 
 Bad Girls Club (disambiguation)
 B.ay A.rea D.erby Girls, a flat-track roller derby league
 Bad Boys (disambiguation)
 Bad Girl (disambiguation)